P&O Princess Cruises plc (stock symbol in London and NYSE: POC) was a shipping company that existed between 2000 and 2003, operating the P&O Cruises, Princess Cruises, P&O Cruises Australia, A'Rosa Cruises, AIDA Cruises and Ocean Village branded cruise lines.  The company was formed from the de-merged passenger services of the Peninsular & Oriental Steam Navigation Company (P&O) and operated until 2003 when it was re-listed as Carnival plc following a merger with Carnival Corporation. Its registered office was in the City of Westminster, London.

History
P&O Princess Cruises originated from the Peninsular & Oriental Steam Navigation Company (P&O), founded in England in 1837. In 1844, the company began operating passenger services which were the forerunner of modern cruise holidays, and as such it became recognised as the world's oldest cruise line.

In 1974, P&O acquired Princess Cruises, a North American cruise line founded in 1964 by Stanley McDonald. In 1977, P&O de-merged its passenger services division to form P&O Cruises. In 1988, P&O de-merged P&O Cruises' Australian operations, acquiring Sitmar Cruises, which led to the formation of P&O Cruises Australia.

In 1999, P&O acquired the Germany cruise line, AIDA Cruises. In 2000, P&O de-merged its cruise ship operations, forming a new company, P&O Princess Cruises Ltd. The company was listed on the London Stock Exchange, making it completely independent of the P&O Group. The company operated the P&O Cruises, P&O Cruises Australia, Princess Cruises and AIDA Cruises brands.

In 2001, talks were held with Royal Caribbean and Festival Cruises to discuss a possible merger. Also in 2001, P&O Princess Cruises launched the A'Rosa Cruises brand. In 2003, P&O Princess Cruises merged with Carnival Corporation to form Carnival Corporation & plc. As a result of the merger, P&O Princess Cruises plc was re-listed as Carnival plc, becoming the UK holding company of the Carnival Group. As Carnival plc, the company largely retained the P&O Princess executive team and shareholder body, with executive control of the group's activities in the UK and Australia.

Head office
The P&O Princess head office was in City of Westminster, London. After P&O accepted a takeover from Carnival Corporation in 2003, the company planned to close the P&O head office in London. P&O Princess offered the 25 employees there a relocation to the P&O Cruises offices in Southampton or dismissal from the company.

Ship ownership
During its brief existence, P&O Princess Cruises owned a number of cruise ships:

A'Rosa Blu - A'Rosa Cruises and Princess Cruises (as Crown Princess)
AIDAcara - AIDA Cruises
AIDAaura - AIDA Cruises
AIDAvita - AIDA Cruises
Aurora - P&O Cruises
Coral Princess - Princess Cruises
Dawn Princess - Princess Cruises
Golden Princess - Princess Cruises
Grand Princess - Princess Cruises
 - Princess Cruises
Ocean Village - Ocean Village and P&O Cruises (as Arcadia)
Oceana - P&O Cruises and Princess Cruises (as Ocean Princess)
Oriana - P&O Cruises
Pacific Princess - Princess Cruises
Pacific Sky - P&O Cruises Australia and Princess Cruises (as Sky Princess)
Regal Princess - Princess Cruises
Royal Princess - Princess Cruises
Sea Princess - Princess Cruises and P&O Cruises (as Adonia)
Star Princess - Princess Cruises
 - Princess Cruises
Tahitian Princess - Princess Cruises
Victoria - P&O Cruises

Impact of COVID-19
During the COVID-19 pandemic many cruise companies postponed their cruise holidays due to safety restrictions. 

During the summer of 2021, a number of British cruise lines including P&O Princess Cruises, attempted to draw customers back to ocean voyages whilst operating under capacity restrictions placed on cruise lines by government Covid-19 restrictions.  By August 2022, Covid-19 restrictions were further relaxed on Princess Cruises with the removal of testing for vaccinated passengers sailing on voyages for less than 16 days. Unvaccinated passengers were permitted to embark on cruises provided a negative test had been taken within 72 hours of sailing.

However, by November 2022, following a significant rise in reported Covid cases on the Majestic Princess which resulted in a tier 3 ship alert, restrictions were reintroduced on Carnival Corporation ships including P&O Australia, Princess Cruises and Carnival Cruise Line. Among other requirements, the restrictions necessitated guests to wear masks in indoor areas classed as 'public spaces', in areas where physical distancing could not be actioned, and during boarding and departing the ship.

Today
The company formerly known as P&O Princess continues to operate as a constituent of the Carnival Group, with executive control of the group's operations in the United Kingdom and Australia. Based at Carnival House in Southampton, Carnival plc provides executive control of  P&O Cruises, P&O Cruises Australia, Cunard Line and Ocean Village. with additional responsibility for the UK sales and marketing of Princess Cruises.

References

External links

 P&O Princess Cruises (Archive)

Carnival Corporation & plc
Defunct cruise lines
P&O (company)
P&O Cruises
Companies formerly listed on the London Stock Exchange
Corporate spin-offs
2003 mergers and acquisitions